Elections to Angus Council were held on 3 May 2007 the same day as the other Scottish local government elections and the Scottish Parliament general election. The election was the first one using 8 new wards created as a result of the Local Governance (Scotland) Act 2004, each ward will elect three or four councillors using the single transferable vote system a form of proportional representation. The new wards replace 29 single-member wards which used the plurality (first past the post) system of election.

Election result

Ward results

By-Elections since 3 May 2007
A by-election was held in the Monifieth & Sidlaw Ward on 25 June 2009 following the death of the SNP's Frank Ellis. This was won by the SNP's Jean Lee

A by-election was held in the Carnoustie & District Ward on 3 February 2011 following the resignation of the SNP's Ralph Palmer. This was won by the Independent Brian Boyd

References

2007 Scottish local elections
2007